Centre Stage Media Arts Foundation (CSMA) is a Zimbabwean non-profit organisation. CSMA uses the human rights centered approach to implement projects on HIV/AIDs, legal education and human rights advocacy, sustainable development and youth development. In implementing its projects, CSMA encourages formal and informal participatory methods, education for sustainable development, as well as broad advocacy strategies, including media and policy advocacy.

To date CSMA has implemented projects on digital rights, access to justice, and HIV prevention through biomedical interventions advocacy, freedom of information and expression, Education for Sustainable Development (ESD), urban youth entrepreneurship and broader peace building and peace making initiatives.

CSMA exists as a creative development hub that responds to multifaceted development challenges facing marginalised and subordinate groups in Zimbabwe. It does this by harnessing the energy and talents of young people and professionals across the different development spectrum. CSMA's development agenda seeks to address the following themes: HIV/AIDS, human rights, poverty eradication, conflict resolution, sustainable development, education, and youth entrepreneurship skills development in Zimbabwe's urban and rural communities.

CSMA's development work in human rights, HIV/AIDS, advocacy for sexual minorities, access to justice and youth development in Zimbabwe is highlighted in this short video

In terms of youth development work, CSMA has partnered with organisations such as the Salzburg Global Seminar, where the organisation has previously presented its work on the importance of availing new and alternative spaces for youth engagement, for the purpose of policymakers. Furthermore, it is hoped that such spaces will serve as human rights empowerment points for marginalised youths, which include adolescent girls, young women and sexual minorities.

CSMA regularly produces commentary in the mainstream media, both in Zimbabwe and internationally to advocate for human rights and biomedical HIV prevention and treatment options;

References

Human rights organisations based in Zimbabwe